The 1942 Toledo Rockets football team was an American football team that represented Toledo University in the Ohio Athletic Conference (OAC) during the 1942 college football season. In their seventh and final season under head coach Clarence Spears, the Rockets compiled a 4–4–1 record.

The team's key players included freshman Emlen Tunnell, an African-American halfback who was later inducted into the Pro Football Hall of Fame. In the opening game against Kent State, Tunnell ran for two touchdowns and passed for two more. Tunnell sustained a broken neck in the October 24 game against Marshall. Tunnell joined the Coast Guard in 1943 and did not return to Toledo after the war

Schedule

References

Toledo
Toledo Rockets football seasons
Toledo Rockets football